
Year 764 (DCCLXIV) was a leap year starting on Sunday (link will display the full calendar) of the Julian calendar. The denomination 764 for this year has been used since the early medieval period, when the Anno Domini calendar era became the prevalent method in Europe for naming years.

Events 
 By place 

 Europe 
 Domenico Monegario is deposed, after Pope Paul I demanded donations from Venice. Monegario is blinded and exiled, and succeeded by Maurizio Galbaio as the 7th doge of Venice. During his reign, Venetian wealth is increased via trade.

 Britain 
 King Offa of Mercia conquers Kent, and brings an end to the rule of kings Ealhmund and Sigered in West Kent. He imposes Mercian overlordship on the kingdom, but allows a local king, Heaberht, to rule there.

 Asia 
 October 14–21 – Fujiwara no Nakamaro Rebellion: A short-lived revolt led by Fujiwara no Nakamaro is suppressed. Emperor Junnin is deposed after a 6-year reign, and forced into exile. Former empress Kōken reassumes the imperial throne of Japan, and takes the name Shōtoku. She appoints her close associate, the priest Dōkyō, prime minister (taishi), running the government with him. Nakamaro is captured and killed with his wife and children.

 By topic 

 Geography 
 According to the historian Theophanes the Confessor, icebergs float past Constantinople from the Black Sea (approximate date).

 Religion 
 Cancor, a Frankish count (possibly of Hesbaye), founds Lorsch Abbey (modern-day Germany).

Births 
 Abu Thawr, Muslim scholar (d. 854)
 Al-Hadi, Muslim caliph (d. 786)
 Fujiwara no Nakanari, Japanese nobleman (d. 810)
 Li Jiang, chancellor of the Tang Dynasty (d. 830)
 Tian Hongzheng, general of the Tang Dynasty (d. 821)

Deaths 
 January 17 – Joseph of Freising, German bishop 
 Arwa bint Mansur al-Himyari, wife of caliph al-Mansur.
 Abdallah ibn Ali, Muslim general
 Bregowine, archbishop of Canterbury 
 Fujiwara no Nakamaro, Japanese statesman (b. 706)
 Stephen the Younger, Byzantine theologian (or 765)

References